The Ghana national women's cricket team is the team that represents Ghana in international women's cricket.

Ghana participated in the inaugural 2015 North West Africa Cricket Council (NWACC) women's tournament held in The Gambia. The team finished third behind Sierra Leone and Gambia, and ahead of Mali. Ghana hosted the second edition of the tournament in 2016.

In April 2018, the International Cricket Council (ICC) granted full Women's Twenty20 International (WT20I) status to all its members. Therefore, all Twenty20 matches played between Ghana women and other ICC members after 1 July 2018 will be a full WT20I. Ghana played their first official WT20I matches in March 2022 during the 2022 Nigeria Invitational Women's T20I Tournament.

Records and statistics

International Match Summary — Ghana Women
 
Last updated 3 April 2022

Twenty20 International

T20I record versus other nations

Records complete to WT20I #1052. Last updated 3 April 2022.

See also
 List of Ghana women Twenty20 International cricketers
 Ghana national cricket team

References

Women's
Women's national cricket teams
Cricket